Debasers Filums Ltd is a film and video production company with offices in Edinburgh and Glasgow. The company name is derived from the song Debaser by the band The Pixies, a favourite of Debasers founder Felipe Bustos Sierra; filums is deliberately misspelt.

The company has produced several short films, including Tixeon (2010), Three-Legged Horses (2012), and Five Six Seven Eight (2012). Three-Legged Horses was the first successfully crowdfunded film project in Scotland, and went on to screen at over 100 international film festivals, on five continents, winning four awards.

Nae Pasaran, their first feature-length film, was directed and produced by Felipe Bustos Sierra. It was based on an earlier 2013 short film by the same name, funded through the Scottish Documentary Institute's Bridging the Gap programme. The film won the Best Feature award at the 2018 British Academy Scotland Awards and Sierra was shortlisted for the Best Director (Factual) award. It was also shortlisted in the Best Documentary category in the 2018 British Independent Film Awards. The film won the Audience Prize at the San Sebastián Human Rights Film Festival in April 2019. The film was first broadcast on the new BBC Scotland channel's first day on air, 24 February 2019.

References

External links

Film production companies of the United Kingdom
Companies based in Edinburgh
British companies established in 2010